The following is a list of Teen Choice Award winners and nominees for Choice Music - Female Artist. Britney Spears, Kelly Clarkson, and Taylor Swift are the most awarded artists in this category with three wins each. Miley Cyrus is the youngest winner in 2008 at the age of 15. Fergie is the oldest winner in 2007 at the age of 32.

Winners and nominees

1999

2000s

2010s

References

Pop music awards
Female Artist
Music awards honoring women